State Disaster Response Force Uttarakhand or SDRF Uttarakhand  is a Specialised Force  of Uttarakhand Police constituted keeping in view the objective of quick and effective execution of immediate relief and rescue works in the state of Uttarakhand during any natural or man-made Disaster.

Background  

On October 9, 2013, a mandate was issued for the formation of the State Disaster Response Force Uttarakhand and approval was given for the formation of 02 companies. In the first phase in the month of February 2014, deputation was done on the basis of merit from Civil Police, PAC, IRB, Wireless, Fire Service and other ancillary branches. For the first 'A' and 'B' company, 152 police personnel/officers were trained in the training centers of National Disaster Response Force, Patna, Bhatinda, Ghaziabad and SDRF Uttarakhand (State Disaster Response Force) was formed in the month of March 2014.

Selection & Training 

The SDRF Uttarakhand has now emerged as a major attraction for the police personnel working in other wings of the Police department and there is a healthy competition among the rank and file to join this force. The primary reasons behind this 
“charm” of joining SDRF Uttarakhand is the location of SDRF battalion in Dehradun where the kith and kin of the personnel have access to better health, education and housing facilities. Moreover, an additional 30% risk allowance is being given to SDRF Uttarakhand workforce. The personnel working with the elite disaster response force were inducted on the basis of merit and imparted training at country's best disaster training institutions.

Selection : SDRF Uttarakhand is an Active force so it Requires Young And trained Police personnel For the operation. The Supply of manpower for SDRF Uttarakhand is done from State Civil Police, Armed Police, PAC, IRB, Fire Service, Wireless and other ancillary branches of Uttarakhand Police to be taken on deputation on the basis of physical fitness and merit for a maximum period of 5-years. The deputation stint with SDRF will enable the personnel to work as a first responder and will also increase the overall capability of police department in disaster management.

Training : In the first phase, 6 weeks training is given to the officers/employees in the Betalion of National Disaster Response Force at Bhatinda, Patna, Gajiabad Battalion. The Uttarakhand government has already approved the proposal of creating a high tech SDRF Training centre in Dehradun, After completion it will become the First high Tech SDRF Training centre in India.
  
The personnel deputed for the Uttarakhand SDRF were provided training by the NDRF on Medical First Responder (MRF), Collapse Structure Search and Rescue (CSSR), Rope rescue, Flood rescue and Chemical Biological Radiological Nuclear (CBRN). Apart from this, the SDRF teams equipped with Dog squads were also trained in relief, search and rescue techniques aimed at conducting operations in earthquake affected and damaged buildings using effective and scientific methods.

Achievement 

1. Significant contribution in the successful conduct of Char Dham Yatra in the year 2014

2. Important contribution in the successful conduct of Nanda Devi Rajjat Yatra in the year 2014

3. In the year 2014, a total of 17 operations were conducted by SDRF Uttarakhand in  the various districts of Uttarakhand, That is  Uttarkashi, Yag, Chamol, Dehradun, Pauri Garhwal and Tehar Garhwal, in which 212
The persons were resuscitated and bodies of 17 persons were exhumed.

4. 21 members of SDRF Uttarakhand Police for Mission Bhagirathi on 27.05.2015 successfully scaled Mount Bhagirathi II (height 21364 feet) by hoisting the national flag on 09.06.2015 at 08:45.  This was the first operation by the SDRF Uttarakhand Police Mountain Commanding Team, SDRF Uttarakhand is the first police force in the country to have such Special Mountain Climbing Team in India. Mountain Bhagirathi II or Bhagirathi Parbat II is located in the Gangotri region in Uttarkashi district of the state of Uttarakhand.

5. The SDRF Uttarakhand team Successfully climb Mt. Satopthi(Height 23263 ft/7075 m) on 10 June 2017 and SDRF Uttarakhand becomes the First Police Force to climb 7000+ altitude peak.

6. On March 29, 2018, a 15-member team of SDRF Uttarakhand Police left for Mount Everest on the mission.
During the journey of about 55 days, the team conquered Lobache East Peak, Kala Pathar Peak and
In the last phase, on May 20 and 21, 08 members hoisted the Indian National flag on Sagarmatha peak. The SDRF Uttarakhand became the first state police of the country successfully scaled Mt. Everest.

7. SDRF team for scaling Mount Gangotri-I -  The SDRF team was flagged off by the chief minister Pushkar Singh Dhami for the expedition on September 9, 2021, and after overcoming several challenges on the way, it hoisted the Indian National flag at the mountain's peak on September 29, 2021. SDRF Uttarakhand is first from Uttarakhand police to have successfully scaled this mountain. The Mountain Climbing Team was led by a woman officer.

See also 

Uttarakhand Police
National Disaster Response Force

References 

Government agencies established in 2014
Disaster Response Forces in India
2014 establishments in Uttarakhand